GLORIA is an album by Ukrainian pop-rock and alternative band Okean Elzy, released in 2005.

The album spawned four # 1 singles (radio airplay) in Ukraine.  The first single was "Bez Boyu" in the summer of 2005, followed by "Vysche Neba", "Ne Pytai", and finally "Vidchuvayu" in the summer of 2006.

Track listing
 "Persha Pisnya"
 "Ty i Ya"
 "Vysche Neba"
 "Sontse Sidaye"
 "Nikoly"
 "Tin Tvoho Tila"
 "Bez Boyu"
 "GLORIA"
 "Vidchuvayu"
 "Ikony Ne Plachut"
 "Yak Ostanniy Den"
 "Ne Pytai"

2005 albums
Okean Elzy albums
Ukrainian-language albums